Ama-e  (fl. circa 2330 BC), was an Ancient Sumerian businesswoman. She lived in the city of Umma during the reign of Sargon of Akkad. She was married to Ur-Sara and her business transactions are well documented in the so-called Ur-Sara family archive. 

She rented land from the crown for cultivating, invested in buildings, traded in barley and metal, and had a network of business agents through which she bought and sold silver, wood, wool, food and perfume.

Ama-e is one of the earliest individual businesswomen of which any significant amount of information is known. While it does not appear to have been uncommon for women to conduct business, as it was regarded as a part of the household duties, no other businesswoman and her transactions from this period or before is as well documented as Ama-e.

References

 Stephanie Lynn Budin, Jean Macintosh Turfa: Women in Antiquity: Real Women across the Ancient World
 Morris Silver: Economic Structures of Antiquity

Ancient businesswomen
24th-century BC women
Sumerian people
Ancient Mesopotamian women